Shivambu may refer to:

 Floyd Shivambu, a South African politician
 Urine therapy